The 1995 Illinois Fighting Illini football team represented the University of Illinois at Urbana–Champaign in the 1995 NCAA Division I-A football season. Illinois finished the season 5–5–1 (3–4–1 in Big Ten play) in Lou Tepper's fourth season as head coach.

Notably, the Illini's 3-3 game with Wisconsin on November 25, 1995, is the last tied game in NCAA Division I-A (now FBS) history.

Schedule

Personnel

Season summary

Michigan

at Oregon

Arizona

East Carolina

at Indiana

Michigan State

Northwestern

at Iowa

at Ohio State

Minnesota

at Wisconsin

1996 NFL Draft
Two of the top three overall picks in the 1996 NFL Draft were from Illinois.

Awards and honors
Kevin Hardy, Butkus Award

References

Illinois
Illinois Fighting Illini football seasons
Illinois Fighting Illini football